Panagiotis Zepos (1908–1985) was a Greek professor of law and a prominent lawyer, who served many times as secretary-general and minister in Greek governments.

Biography 
He was born in Athens and he was the son of lawyer Ioannis Zepos. His brother, Dimitris, was also a lawyer. After graduating from the Law School of the University of Athens, he attended master courses in University of Berlin. In 1931 he obtained a PhD in law from the University of Athens and three years later was elected reader in the Law School.

In 1939 he was elected assistant professor and, later, full professor in University of Thessaloniki. In 1954 he was elected professor of civil law in University of Athens, holding this position until 1974, when he retired.

In 1970 he was selected ordinary member of Athens Academy, of which he served as president in 1975.

He served as secretary-general in the Ministry of Justice (1935), secretary-general in the Ministry of Education (1945), and Minister of the Interior and Minister of National Education in the national unity cabinet of 1974 and Konstantinos Karamanlis' government in 1974–1976.

He died in 1985 in Athens and he is buried in the First Cemetery of Athens. He was survived by his wife and his daughter.

References  	

1908 births
1985 deaths
20th-century Greek lawyers
National and Kapodistrian University of Athens alumni
Academic staff of the National and Kapodistrian University of Athens
Academic staff of the Aristotle University of Thessaloniki
Members of the Academy of Athens (modern)
Ministers of National Education and Religious Affairs of Greece
Burials at the First Cemetery of Athens
Ministers of the Interior of Greece
Politicians from Athens